The following Union Army units and commanders fought in the Battle of Chickamauga of the American Civil War. The Confederate order of battle is listed separately. Order of battle compiled from the army organization during the campaign.

Abbreviations used

Military Rank
 MG = Major General
 BG = Brigadier General
 Col = Colonel
 Ltc = Lieutenant Colonel
 Maj = Major
 Cpt = Captain
 Lt = 1st Lieutenant

Other
 w = wounded
 mw = mortally wounded
 k = killed

Army of the Cumberland

MG William Rosecrans, Commanding

General Staff
Chief of Staff: BG James A. Garfield
 Col James Barnett, Chief of Artillery
 Col William Truesdale
 Col John P. Sanderson, ADC
 Col Joseph C. McKibbin, ADC
 Ltc Calvin Goddard, Adjutant General
 Ltc Arthur C. Ducat, Inspector General
 Ltc Henry C. Hodges, Quartermaster General
 Ltc Samuel Simmons, Commissary of Subsistence
 Ltc William M. Wiles, Provost Marshal General
 Maj William M. McMichael, Adjutant General
 Maj Frank S. Bond, ADC
 Cpt Horace Porter, Chief of Ordnance
 Cpt Andrew S. Burt, Acting Inspector General
 Cpt Hunter Brooke, Acting Judge Advocate General
 Cpt William E. Merrill, Topographical Engineer
 Cpt William C. Margedant, Topographical Engineer
 Cpt Jesse Merrill, Signal Officer
 Cpt John C. Van Duzer, Telegraph
 Cpt R.S. Thomas, ADC
 Cpt James P. Drouillard, ADC
 Cpt Charles R. Thompson, ADC
 Cpt William Farrar, ADC
 Lt M.J. Kelly, Chief of Couriers
 Lt George Burroughs, Engineer
 Lt William L. Porter, Acting ADC
 Lt James K. Reynolds, Acting ADC
 Glover Perin, Surgeon
 Henry H. Seys, Surgeon
 D. Bache, Assistant Surgeon
 Jeremiah F. Trecy, Chaplain

General Headquarters
 1st Battalion, Ohio Sharpshooters: Cpt Gershom M. Barber
 10th Ohio Infantry: Ltc William M. Ward
 15th Pennsylvania Cavalry: Col William J. Palmer

Pioneer Brigade
BG James St. Clair Morton, Chief Engineer (w)
 1st Pioneer Battalion
 2nd Pioneer Battalion
 3rd Pioneer Battalion

XIV Corps

MG George Henry Thomas

Headquarters

Provost guard:
 9th Michigan Infantry: Col John Gibson Parkhurst

Escort:
 1st Ohio Cavalry, Company L: Cpt John D. Barker

XX Corps

MG Alexander McDowell McCook

Headquarters

Provost guard:
81st Indiana Infantry, Company H: Cpt William J. Richards

Escort:
2nd Kentucky Cavalry, Company I: Lt George W. L. Batman

XXI Corps

MG Thomas Leonidas Crittenden

Headquarters

Escort:
15th Illinois Cavalry, Company K: Cpt Samuel B. Sherer

Reserve Corps
MG Gordon Granger

Cavalry Corps

BG Robert B. Mitchell

Notes

References
 U.S. War Department, The War of the Rebellion: a Compilation of the Official Records of the Union and Confederate Armies, U.S. Government Printing Office, 1880–1901.
 Civil War Home: The Chickamauga Campaign. Union Order of Battle 
 Union Chickamauga Order of Battle at Civil War Virtual Tours
 

American Civil War orders of battle
Union order of battle
William Rosecrans
George Henry Thomas